Snowtown (also known as The Snowtown Murders) is a 2011 Australian biographical crime drama directed by Justin Kurzel in his directorial debut and written by Shaun Grant based on the true story of the Snowtown murders.

Plot
In the poor Adelaide suburb of Salisbury, 16-year-old Jamie (Lucas Pittaway) lives with his distressed mother, Elizabeth Harvey (Louise Harris), and his brothers—including Troy (Anthony Groves), who rapes Jamie. One day, his mother's boyfriend takes indecent photographs of the boys. When the police are reluctant to intervene, Elizabeth is contacted by Barry (Richard Green), a gay cross-dressing man who introduces her to John (Daniel Henshall). John, who despises paedophiles and homosexuals, continually harasses the boyfriend via means such as throwing kangaroo's blood and body parts at his house until he moves away. John begins to assume the role of Jamie's father figure. Barry tells John the names and addresses of paedophiles in the area, and John creates a wall with pictures and details about each, including notes saying things like "I'm coming for you".

Jamie finds himself slowly drawn into John's homophobic and violent tendencies, unable to escape his charismatic and intimidating dominance. On one occasion, John, aware that Jamie is being raped by his brother Troy, wants Jamie to stand up for himself, and in pursuit of this, gives him a gun and has Jamie shoot his dog. Meanwhile, John influences the rest of the neighbourhood with his extremely homophobic views and separates Barry from his younger boyfriend Robert (Aaron Viergever). Only Troy seems to dislike John. Barry soon disappears, leaving behind only an answering machine message saying that he is going to Queensland. John brings Jamie in as the neophyte member of his small team who "bury men".

Shortly afterward, Jamie visits his drug-addicted best friend Gavin (Bob Adriaens) with John, who takes a dislike to Gavin. Later one night, John and Robert take Jamie into his garden shed and show him the bodies of Barry and Gavin. Distressed, Jamie lashes out at John but remains under his influence. Later, John and Robert torture Troy, and Jamie then kills the brutalised Troy in an act of mercy. Now desensitized, Jamie assists John in carrying out several murders. John and his team store the bodies in the vault of an abandoned bank in the town of Snowtown.

Jamie is persuaded by John to lure his half-brother Dave (Beau Gosling) to the bank building, ostensibly to look at a computer for sale. Jamie drives with him to the town, vaguely conscious of what he is doing, and leads Dave into the building, where he is met by John and Robert. Unaware of what is going on, Dave watches Jamie shut the door of the bank.

Against a black screen, captions reveal that South Australia Police discovered the remains of eight people stored in barrels in the bank vault of Snowtown on 20 May 1999, and the following day, John Bunting and Robert Wagner were arrested.

Cast

 Daniel Henshall as John Bunting
 Lucas Pittaway as James "Jamie" Vlassakis
 Aaron Viergever as Robert Wagner
 David Walker as Mark Haydon
 Louise Harris as Elizabeth Harvey
 Keiran Schwerdt as Thomas Trevilyan
 Bob Adriaens as Gavin
 Frank Cwiertniak as Jeffrey
 Matthew Howard as Nicholas
 Marcus Howard as Alex
 Anthony Groves as Troy
 Richard Green as Barry
 Beau Gosling as Dave
 Craig Coyne as Ray

Production
Screen Australia announced in March 2010 that it would be funding the film and Film Victoria provided $245,000. The film was produced by Warp Films Australia, a collaboration between Warp Films and distributor Madman Entertainment.

Peter Campbell of Warp Films Australia had to get the remaining suppression orders lifted so the film could be premiered.

Snowtown is Kurzel's first feature-length film as director. His short film Bluetongue was shown at the 2005 Cannes Film Festival.

Apart from Henshall and Green, the actors were locals with no acting experience, whom Kurzel had found in the area where the murders occurred, with most from Davoren Park. Kurzel himself grew up in the area and felt that using locals would move the film from being a one-dimensional horror show to a tragic human story showing what happens when people are disadvantaged. Davoren Park is considered one of the most violent and dysfunctional suburbs in Australia and a place where emergency vehicles fear to go without a police escort. According to Kurzel, far from the "wow, I'm going to be a movie star" attitude that he had expected, he had some difficulty convincing them to take part.

The film was shot in Smithfield Plains, South Australia, an outer suburb of the Adelaide metropolitan area.

Release
Snowtown premiered at the 2011 Adelaide Film Festival and won the festival's "Audience Award", and was selected as one of seven films from around the world that were shown at International Critics' Week competitions that ran in parallel with the 2011 Cannes Film Festival. At Cannes, the film was awarded with a Special Mention.

The film was released in the United Kingdom by Revolver Entertainment and, in North America, IFC Midnight.

Box office
The film grossed $8,452 in the U.S., $1,133,435 in Australia, and $207,500 in France and the UK.

Critical reception
The film received generally positive reviews from critics. Review aggregator Rotten Tomatoes lists an 83% approval rating based on 65 reviews with an average rating of 7.5 out of 10 with the consensus "It's a bleak and brutal endurance test, but for viewers with the strength and patience to make it to the end, Snowtown will prove an uncommonly powerful viewing experience." On Metacritic, the film holds a 66 out of 100 rating based on 13 critics, indicating "generally favorable reviews".

Peter Bradshaw reviewed the film for The Guardian and gave it four stars out of five, saying that Snowtown "is a well made but gruesome and often unwatchably violent film." He concluded by stating that it reminded him of 10 Rillington Place and that while films "like David Fincher's Zodiac, or Jaime Rosales's The Hours of the Day, or Shohei Imamura's Vengeance Is Mine demystified the killer's macabre criminal career in their various ways; what Snowtown does is create a social-realist horror story showing the killer as parodic paterfamilias."

Fiona Williams of SBS awarded the film three-and-a-half stars out of five, commenting that director Kurzel "sidesteps the gore—mostly—to focus instead on the circumstances that enabled the atrocities to occur ... It's a gripping, discomforting watch."

Channel Nine entertainment reporter Richard Wilkins gave the film a rating of zero stars, stating "This is as close to a snuff movie as I ever want to see … I don't care if it's rooted in truth or not, it's appalling. I've seen it so you don't have to." This review was criticised by culture zine Pedestrian TV and was dismissed by Kurzel and actress Louise Harris.

Awards and nominations

References

External links
 
 
 

2011 biographical drama films
2011 crime drama films
2010s mystery films
2011 films
APRA Award winners
Australian biographical drama films
Australian coming-of-age films
Australian crime drama films
LGBT-related drama films
Australian independent films
Australian LGBT-related films
Fiction about animal cruelty
Films about dysfunctional families
Films based on non-fiction books
Films directed by Justin Kurzel
Screen Australia films
Films set in South Australia
Films set in 1998
Films set in 1999
Films set in the 1990s
Films shot in Australia
Homophobia in fiction
LGBT-related coming-of-age films
Films about rape
Films about anti-LGBT sentiment
Incest in film
Films about child sexual abuse
Australian serial killer films
2010s serial killer films
2011 independent films
Films scored by Jed Kurzel
2011 LGBT-related films
2011 directorial debut films
2010s English-language films
English-language drama films